Richard Corneil is a Canadian academic administrator. He was the principal and chief administrator of Assumption University, a Roman Catholic institution in Windsor, Ontario, Canada from April 2015-August 2019. He was formerly on staff at St. Peter's Seminary in London, Ontario, where he was the director of the Institute for Catholic Formation.

References

External links
Assumption University, Administration Page

Canadian university and college chief executives
Living people
Year of birth missing (living people)